Qezel Arsalan, (also Ghezel Arsala) (Azerbaijani language: Qızıl Ərsalan, Persian language:قزل ارسلان ) is a mountain peak with a height of 3250 meters in the Alvand ranges of the Zagros mountains in western Iran.

It is also the name of an Iranian movie produced in 1956.

References

Mountains of Iran
Mountains of Hamedan Province